Mary Freeman may refer to:

Mary Freeman (swimmer) (born 1933)
Mary Freeman (marine biologist) (1924–2018) 
Mary Lou Freeman (1941–2006), American politician from Iowa 
Mary Eleanor Wilkins Freeman (1852–1930), American author